Nathan Lewis Poole (born December 17, 1956) is a former professional American football player who played running back in the National Football League. He was drafted in the 10th round (250th overall) of the 1979 NFL Draft by the Cincinnati Bengals after playing college football for the University of Louisville. He played in the NFL for six seasons, two for the Bengals and four for the Denver Broncos.

1956 births
Living people
American football running backs
Cincinnati Bengals players
Denver Broncos players
Louisville Cardinals football players
People from Alexander City, Alabama
Players of American football from Alabama
National Football League replacement players